The ARIA Urban Album Chart ranks the highest-selling country albums within Australia and is provided by the Australian Recording Industry Association.

History
The Country Album Chart was established in 2001 and first published on 1 January. The chart still runs weekly . The current number one is One Thing at a Time by Morgan Wallen.

Trivia

Albums with the most weeks at number one
69 weeks 
Taylor Swift – Fearless (2009–2010)
48 weeks
Luke Combs – This One's for You (2018–2019, 2022–2023)
39 weeks 
Keith Urban – Ripcord (2016–2017)
38 weeks
Luke Combs – What You See Ain't Always What You Get (2020–2022)
36 weeks
Dixie Chicks – Taking the Long Way (2006–2007)
34 weeks
Kasey Chambers – Barricades & Brickwalls (2002–2003)
Luke Combs – What You See Is What You Get (2019–2020)
32 weeks
Dixie Chicks – Home (2003–2004)
29 weeks
Kasey Chambers – Wayward Angel (2004–2005)
28 weeks
Faith Hill – Breathe (2001)
27 weeks
Lady Antebellum – Need You Now (2010–2011)
26 weeks
Taylor Swift – Red (2012–2015)
24 weeks
Taylor Swift – Red (Taylor's Version) (2021–2022)

Artists with the most number ones
 Lee Kernaghan (9)
 Adam Brand (8)
 Keith Urban (8)
 Kasey Chambers (7)
 Troy Cassar-Daley (7)
 Taylor Swift (6)
 Carrie Underwood (5)
 Luke Combs (4)

See also

ARIA Digital Album Chart

References

Australian record charts